Bruno Giacometti (24 August 1907 — 21 March 2012) was a Swiss architect and the brother of the artists Alberto and Diego Giacometti. He was among the most notable post-World War II architects in Switzerland.

Biography 
Giacometti was born in Stampa. After studies with Otto Salvisberg and Karl Moser at the ETH Zurich, he worked as an architect in Zurich, initially for Karl Egender. There, he designed the Hallenstadion (1939) and the hygiene and pharmacology institutes of the University of Zurich (1960) among others. His other main works include the Swiss pavilion at the Venice Biennale in 1952, the schools of Brusio (1962), the Uster town hall (1965) and the Chur natural history museum (1982).

Giacometti was married to Odette Duperret from 1935 until her death in February 2007. He lived in Zollikon near Zürich until his death at the age of 104 in March 2012.

References

1907 births
2012 deaths
Alberto Giacometti
People from Maloja District
Swiss-Italian people
Swiss Protestants
Swiss centenarians
20th-century Swiss architects
Sibling artists
Men centenarians